Ceratellopsis is a genus of fungi in the family Clavariaceae. Basidiocarps (fruit bodies) grow gregariously on fallen wood, bark, and decaying plant material and are clavarioid, simple, small (under 2 mm tall), with an acute apex. Only two species are currently recognized; other species formerly placed in Ceratellopsis have been transferred to other genera or are nomina dubia.

References

Clavariaceae
Agaricomycetes genera